The Men's 400 metres T46 event at the 2012 Summer Paralympics took place at the London Olympic Stadium on 4 September.

Records
Prior to the competition, the existing World and Paralympic records were as follows:

Results

Round 1
Competed 4 September 2012 from 10:38. Qual. rule: first 3 in each heat (Q) plus the 2 fastest other times (q) qualified.

Heat 1

Heat 2

Final
Competed 4 September 2012 at 20:54.

Q = qualified by place. q = qualified by time. WR = World Record. PR = Paralympic Record. RR = Regional Record. PB = Personal Best.

References

Athletics at the 2012 Summer Paralympics